Club Independiente Petrolero is a football club from Sucre, Bolivia currently playing in the Bolivian Primera División, the top-tier football league in Bolivia. The club was founded on April 4, 1932 and plays its home games at the Estadio Olímpico Patria. The team had two spells in the Liga de Fútbol Profesional Boliviano. The first one lasted from 1981 to 1983 and the second one from 1990 to 2003.

Achievements

National honours
División Profesional: 1
2021
First Division – Semiprofessional Era: 0
Second Division, Copa Simón Bolivar: 0
Runners-up: 2020

Players

First-team squad

Performance in CONMEBOL competitions
Copa CONMEBOL: 1 appearance
Best: First Round in 1999 (4–1, 0–3, 4–5 on penalties vs.  Talleres)
1999 – First Round

References

 
Independiente Petrolero
1932 establishments in Bolivia
Sport in Sucre